"Drift & Die" is a song by Puddle of Mudd, released as the third single from their album Come Clean in 2001. The song previously appeared on their 1994 EP, Stuck, released as a single locally. Although less popular than the crossover hits "Blurry" and "She Hates Me", "Drift & Die" still receives regular airplay on rock radio stations today, as well as being the band's sixth best-selling single in the United States. The song spent six weeks at number one on the Billboard Hot Mainstream Rock Tracks chart during the summer of 2002. The song is featured on the Muchmusic compilation album, Big Shiny Tunes 7.

Music video
Music video set in Los Angeles, one of the band members practicing, rehearsing for musical concert, last moment shown on the roof top helipad of US Bank Tower with the view of LA.

Track listings
US and Europe promo

UK and Europe promo

Charts

External links

References

Puddle of Mudd songs
2002 singles
Geffen Records singles
Songs written by Wes Scantlin
Songs written by Jimmy Allen (musician)